Carnero Creek is a stream in the U.S. state of Arizona.

Carnero is a name derived from Spanish meaning "sheep".

See also
 List of rivers of Arizona

References

Rivers of Apache County, Arizona
Rivers of Arizona